Apinagia is a genus of flowering plants belonging to the family Podostemaceae.

Its native range is Southern Tropical America.

Species:

Apinagia aripecuruensis 
Apinagia arminensis 
Apinagia batrachiifolia 
Apinagia brejoagrestinensis 
Apinagia brevicaulis 
Apinagia crispa 
Apinagia digitata 
Apinagia dissecta 
Apinagia divaricata 
Apinagia flexuosa 
Apinagia fluitans 
Apinagia fucoides 
Apinagia gardneriana 
Apinagia glaziovii 
Apinagia goejei 
Apinagia guairaensis 
Apinagia guyanensis 
Apinagia hulkiana 
Apinagia itanensis 
Apinagia kochii 
Apinagia latifolia 
Apinagia leptophylla 
Apinagia longifolia 
Apinagia marowynensis 
Apinagia membranacea 
Apinagia multibranchiata 
Apinagia petiolata 
Apinagia platystigma 
Apinagia pusilla 
Apinagia richardiana 
Apinagia ruppioides 
Apinagia spruceana 
Apinagia staheliana 
Apinagia surumuensis 
Apinagia tenuifolia 
Apinagia treslingiana 
Apinagia versteegiana

References

Podostemaceae
Malpighiales genera